San José Department is a department of Uruguay. Its capital is San José de Mayo. It borders Colonia Department to the west, Flores Department to the north and the departments of Florida, Canelones and Montevideo to the east. Its southern limits are described by its coastline on Rio de la Plata.

Demographics

As of the census of 2011, San José Department had a population of 108,309 (53,998 male and 54,311 female) and 43,023 households.

Demographic data for San José Department in 2010:
Population growth rate: 0.941%
Birth Rate: 14.60 births/1,000 people
Death Rate: 8.44 deaths/1,000 people
Average age: 33.2 (32.1 male, 34.2 female)
Life Expectancy at Birth:
Total population: 77.72 years
Male: 73.90 years
Female: 81.61 years
Average per household income: 24,747 pesos/month
Urban per capita income: 9,928 pesos/month
2010 Data Source:

Main Urban Centres 
Population stated as per 2011 census.

* Places that have been integrated into Ciudad del Plata in 2006.

Other towns and villages
Population stated as per 2011 census.

Rural population
According to the 2011 census, San José department has an additional rural population of 16,471.

See also
 List of populated places in Uruguay#San José Department

References

External links

INE map of San José Department
San José Department, Enciclopedia Geográfica del Uruguay
Junta Departamental de San José
Nuestra Terra, Colección Los Departamentos, Vol.1 "San José"

 
Departments of Uruguay
States and territories established in 1816
1816 establishments in Uruguay